Ruby Thursday (Thursday Rubinstein) is a fictional character appearing in American comic books published by Marvel Comics. She is usually depicted as a member of the Headmen. She is named for the Rolling Stones song, "Ruby Tuesday".

Publication history
Ruby Thursday first appeared in The Defenders #32-33 (February–March 1976), and was created by Steve Gerber, Sal Buscema and Jim Mooney.

The character subsequently appears in Defenders #35 (May 1976), Defenders Annual #1 (October 1976), Omega the Unknown #9-10 (July, September 1976), Defenders #76-77 (October–November 1979), The Sensational She-Hulk vol. 2 #1-3 (May–July 1989), Web of Spider-Man #73 (February 1991), Deathlok #2-5 (August–November 1991), Marvel Comics Presents #97 (December 1992), The Defenders vol. 2 #5 (July 2001), 8-10 (October–December 2001), I ♥ Marvel: Outlaw Love (April 2006), She-Hulk vol. 2 #10 (October 2006), and Heroes for Hire #6-8 (March–May 2007).

Ruby Thursday appeared as part of the "Headmen" entry in the original Official Handbook of the Marvel Universe #5, and in The Official Handbook of the Marvel Universe Update '89 #3, and she received an entry in The All-New Official Handbook of the Marvel Universe A to Z: Update #4 (2007).

Fictional character biography
Thursday was a scientist who grafted an organic computer to her head composed of malleable plastic that can assume any form she wills it to. She was recruited by Arthur Nagan into the supervillain group known as the Headmen. Her residence at the time was a mansion in Laurel Canyon. Her intentions at the time of joining the headmen were to replace the head of every human with a plastic head like hers.

She ran for President of the United States as the candidate of the "Global Head" political party under the slogan "New heads for old". She was forced to drop out after Jack Norriss (associated with the superhero team known as the Defenders) tricked her into revealing her non-human self at a public campaign event. Shortly after the end of her presidential campaign, she was defeated by the Hulk and captured along with the rest of the Headmen by the Defenders.

She later partners with a large purple creature called Dibbuk (named after, but unrelated to a dybbuk) and bases herself in Las Vegas. She robs Omega the Unknown of $55,000 in casino winnings in a Las Vegas hotel room. Omega chases her on foot in Las Vegas. Police arriving on the scene see a superhuman man in costume (Omega) appearing to assault a normal woman (Ruby) in her car. Omega starts brawling with the police and they open fire killing him.

After the death of Omega, Ruby notices that his body is made up of advanced organic cybernetics. She steals his body from a Las Vegas morgue and attempts to dissect it intending to incorporate its technology into her head. Confronted by the Defenders, her plastic head is struck by the Wasp's bio-electric "sting". The head breaks open and Dibbuk teleports a seriously wounded Ruby away. When next seen, her plastic head appears much smaller.

Ruby later participates in the plan to gain her ally Chondu the Mystic a new body; specifically, the body of a clone of She-Hulk. The Headmen hire the Ringmaster and his Circus of Crime, then later Mysterio in order to test She-Hulk for compatibility. She is subdued and cloned, but escapes with the aid of Spider-Man. Ruby is arrested by the New York city police.

Ruby begins running weapons procurement scams against A.I.M. She partners with and becomes romantically involved with the Answer. After having stolen money from A.I.M. on five occasions, A.I.M. hires the assassin Bullseye to kill Ruby. He uses her relationship with Answer to draw her out of hiding and throws the Rolling Stones album Flashpoint (which contains the song "Ruby Tuesday") into her chest apparently killing the biological portion of her body. The Answer saves her head after Bullseye leaves in hopes of reviving her later.

During the Civil War, Ruby later is involved in a high-speed 'chase' through the streets of Manhattan. The super-heroine Hellcat ends up clinging to her bumper. Ruby uses her malleable head to fire a gun at Hellcat during the pursuit. The fight is ended with the intervention of She-Hulk and her allies. She-Hulk does not actually go for Ruby, she takes down Hellcat first for being an unlicensed superhero. The results of Ruby's rampage are shown in the forms of cars being shot up, people traumatized by this, and a cab ending up through the front window of a bookstore. Ruby herself is subdued by the weaponry of Two-Gun Kid, a licensed bounty hunter for the state of New York.

Ruby and the Headmen then fought the Heroes for Hire while attempting to transplant Chondu's head onto Humbug's body. At some point, she was imprisoned in The Raft, which Wolverine broke her out of in his plan against Romulus. Ruby was contacted by Romulus and her daughter's life was threatened, forcing her to give Romulus the information to Wolverine's plans. When confronted by Wolverine, Ruby attacked, defeating him by impaling him with the tentacles she had formed with her head. Soon, Cloak, Silver Samurai, Skaar, and Bruce Banner appeared, all battling Ruby Thursday. She held her own, but was eventually caught by Skaar and teleported back to The Raft by Cloak. It was later discovered The Answer is the one who had planned her escape.

Following the Avengers vs. X-Men storyline, Ruby Thursday is among the villains that are imprisoned at an unnamed prison. She participated in a prison riot until she and the other villains were defeated by Mimic and Rogue.

As part of the "All-New, All-Different Marvel" branding, Ruby Thursday subsequently attacks a police station with Gibbon, Griffin, and Shriek. The quartet is subdued by Spider-Woman's apprentice, Porcupine.

Powers and abilities
Ruby Thursday's head had been replaced with a mass of "organic circuitry". The red spherical mass has the ability to alter its shape so she can form appendages or weapons, replenish herself, and project different bursts of energy. If the sphere is separated from her body, she can still control it, no matter how far. Ruby is also a scientific genius, with knowledge in engineering and robotics.

References

External links
 Ruby Thursday at Marvel.com

Characters created by Jim Mooney
Characters created by Sal Buscema
Characters created by Steve Gerber
Comics characters introduced in 1976
Fictional characters with energy-manipulation abilities
Fictional characters with immortality
Fictional engineers
Fictional roboticists
Fictional technopaths
Marvel Comics characters who are shapeshifters
Marvel Comics characters with accelerated healing
Marvel Comics cyborgs
Marvel Comics female supervillains
Marvel Comics scientists